Berlin Humboldthain (in German Bahnhof Berlin Humboldthain) is a railway station in the city of Berlin, Germany. It is also served by local bus route 247.

History 
The S-Bahn station was opened on 21 January 1935, construction having started on 8 January 1934.

Services 
The station is served by the following services:

 Berlin S-Bahn services  Oranienburg – Wittenau – Gesundbrunnen – Friedrichstraße – Potsdamer Platz – Schöneberg – Steglitz – Wannsee
 Berlin S-Bahn services  Bernau – Karow – Pankow – Gesundbrunnen – Friedrichstraße – Potsdamer Platz – Sudkreuz – Blankenfelde
 Berlin S-Bahn services  Hennigsdorf – Tegel – Gesundbrunnen – Friedrichstraße – Potsdamer Platz – Sudkreuz – Lichterfelde – Teltow
 Berlin S-Bahn services  Waidmannslust - Wittenau - Gesundbrunnen - Friedrichstraße - Potsdamer Platz - Sudkreuz - Lichterfelde - Teltow

External links
Station information

References

Berlin S-Bahn stations
Railway stations in Berlin
Buildings and structures in Mitte
Railway stations in Germany opened in 1935